This is a list of islands of Yemen.

See also

 List of islands
 Geography of Yemen

External links
 

Yemen
 
Islands